Kenya Advanced Institute of Science and Technology is a planned postgraduate-only  public university under construction in Kenya, the largest economy in the East African Community. The establishment of the university is aimed at meeting the shortage of highly skilled engineers, needed in the country and the region, to drive Kenya into an industrialized nation by 2030.

Location
The university is under development on a  plot of land in Konza Technology City, in Machakos County, close to the county's borders with Makueni County and Kajiado County.

Overview
The Government of Kenya, in collaboration with the county governments of Machakos, Makueni and Kajiado counties, and the Konza Technopolis Development Authority (KoTDA), plan to establish an advanced institute of science and technology. The institute is planned to be an all-postgraduate research public university.

After competitive bidding, the Korea Advanced Institute of Science and Technology won the bid to design the university curriculum. A consortium of two Korean architectural and engineering firms of "Samoo" and "Sunjin", won the bid to design and construct the university campus. Those contracts were signed in November 2018.

Construction and funding
Construction is funded by a KSh10 billion (US$95 million) loan from the Export–Import Bank of Korea to the Kenyan government. The facilities are expected to be ready in 2021, with the first intake of 200 postgraduate students starting classes in 2022.

Academics
The university will start with six initial departments:

 Mechanical Engineering
 Electrical and Electronic Engineering
 ICT Engineering
 Chemical Engineering
 Civil Engineering and
 Agricultural Biotechnology.

See also
 KAIST
 Education in Kenya

References

External links
 KAIST seals the deal for Kenya KAIST project As of 2 December 2018.
 Kenya, South Korea set to sign pact for Sh10bn Konza City university As of 30 May 2016.

Universities and colleges in Kenya
Education in Kenya
Machakos County
Science education